The punt kick is a common style of kicking in Australian rules football. It is a kick where the ball is dropped from the players' hands and kicked slightly off the longer centre line of the ball before it hits the ground. It is the primary means of kicking the ball in Australian football and is similar to punts used tactically in other football codes, such as American and Canadian football.

There are different styles of kicking depending on how the ball is held in the hand.

The most common style of kicking seen in today's game, principally because of its superior accuracy, is the drop punt, where the ball is dropped from the hands down, almost to the ground, to be kicked so that the ball rotates in a reverse end over end motion as it travels through the air. Other commonly used kicks are the torpedo punt (also known as the spiral, barrel, or screw punt), where the ball is held flatter at an angle across the body, which makes the ball spin around its long axis in the air, resulting in extra distance (similar to the traditional motion of an American football punt), and the checkside punt or "banana", kicked across the ball on the outside of the foot is used to curve the ball (towards the right if kicked off the right foot) towards targets that are on an angle. There is also the "snap", which is almost the same as a checkside punt, except that it is kicked off the inside of the foot and curves in the opposite direction. It is also possible to kick the ball so that it bounces along the ground. This is known as a grubber or dribble kick. Grubbers can bounce in a straight line, or curve to the left or right.

Drop punt

In a drop punt the ball is held vertically, and dropped and kicked before it hits the ground, resulting in the ball spinning backwards end over end. It is the primary method of disposing the ball by foot in Australian rules football. It is considered more accurate and easier to mark than a regular punt kick, which is held flat and does not spin in the air.
In gridiron football it is referred to as a pooch punt or quick kick, a kick used by punters when the team is too far out for a field goal and too close to kick a normal punt because the ball will probably go into the end zone, losing field position in the resulting touchback.  The kick has gradually replaced the less effective "coffin-corner kick", which was similar to rugby football's "kicking for touch" where the object was to put the ball out of bounds near the opposition goal.  Like Australian rules football drop punts, the pooch punt requires the punter to control the distance and former Australian footballers like Darren Bennett and Ben Graham are generally credited with increasing the popularity of this kick in the National Football League.

Jack Dyer is generally credited with inventing the drop punt during his playing days with the Richmond Football Club. Horrie Clover and the Collier brothers, Albert and Harry, are also attributed with being the first to use the kick regularly.

Torpedo punt
The torpedo punt (also known as screw punt or spiral punt) is the longest type of punt kick. In flight, the ball spins about its long axis, instead of end over end (like a drop punt) or not at all (like a regular punt kick). This makes the flight of the ball more aerodynamic, but more difficult to catch (or mark in some football codes).

In Australian rules football, the kick has become less common since the 1980s, as modern tactics have meant that accuracy has become typically more important than distance in field kicking; coaches now prefer the use of the drop punt in general field play. The kick may still be seen when a player needs additional distance or when a game is played in wet weather and forward movement by conventional methods is more difficult as a result. If kicked correctly, an Australian football can travel over 60 metres, while a normal punt will travel less distance. Australian rules footballer Gordon Rattray, who played his football with the Fitzroy Football Club between 1917 and 1928, is credited as the first player to use the torpedo punt.

Checkside punt

Also known as a 'banana kick', the checkside punt is a kicking style used in Australian rules football, rugby league and rugby union. When kicked, it bends away from the body. For the true checkside, the ball is held with ends pointing to 2 and 8 o-clock (for a right footed kick) and is kicked more off the outside of the boot with the ball spinning at an opposite direction to the swing of the leg. This enables the ball to have a greater curving effect thus opening up the face of the goals to give a larger goal face.

In the early 1890s, Allen Burns, who played Australian rules with the (then) Victorian Football Association club South Melbourne, was renowned for what seems to be an early version of the banana kick. The following is taken from newspaper reports of the match between Fitzroy and South Melbourne on Saturday 23 June 1894, that was played in showers of rain, on a very wet and slippery ground, with a very heavy and very wet leather football:

Also, c.1908, there was Fitzroy and Essendon's Paddy Shea:
"Paddy was an accomplished drop, punt and place kick and he was the only forward I knew (and still know [viz., in 1954]) who could make a ball swerve in the air from his boot as a bowler can from his hand.He could stand near a boundary post and swing it with certaintv between the goal posts.That master football tactician Jack Worrall, who coached Essendon after he left Carlton, had to see Paddy at practice before he was convinced of his ability.Worrall had never before seen it in his many years association with the game as player and coach." — George Hale, in The Sporting Globe, 5 June 1954.

Also, mid-1940s, the Tasmanian footballer, Ted Collis, who played with Hawthorn in 1946:
"Ted Collis, the Tasmanian at Hawthorn, is unorthodox in his kicking methods. Shooting for goal at an angle last night, he kicked eight through from 10 shots. He held the ball side on, and it went through like a boomerang." — The Argus, 3 May 1946.

With the skills of Paddy Shea in the VFL in the first decade of the 20th century long-forgotten, many (mistakenly) believe that St Kilda Full Forward William (Bill) Young — otherwise renowned for kicking goals backwards over his head (as was Richmond's Donald Don) — was the first player to use the kick in the VFL. He had been using it in the 1940s at Victorian Country Club Stratford and there is photographic evidence of him using it against Collingwood in the 1950s. Others say the kick was first popularised in South Australia in the 1960s by the Sturt Football Club coached by Jack Oatey.

Brought to the VFL by Richmond's Blair Campbell in the late 1960s, it is now one of the most common techniques for goal-kicking from a narrow angle, and more recently has been used in field kicking with deadly accuracy by players like James Hird, but was most famously used by Peter Daicos. It is usually used when a set shot for goal is lined up on a narrow angle.

See also

 Grubber kick
 Bomb kick
 Drop kick

References

External links
 Kicking Aussie Rules style
 How To Punt Kick

Australian rules football terminology
Australian rules football skills
Articles containing video clips